Bread, Love and Dreams is a 2010 South Korean television drama starring Yoon Shi-yoon, Eugene, Joo Won and Lee Young-ah. It tells the story of how a determined young baker overcomes many trials towards his goal of becoming the best baker in Korea. This story takes place in the 1970s to 1990s, starting after his conception and finishing when he reaches his mid-20s. The series aired on KBS2 from June 9 to September 16, 2010, on Wednesdays and Thursdays at 22:00 (KST) for 30 episodes.

The series was one of the most watched shows in South Korea in 2010, with a final episode viewership rating of 50.9% and becoming the 25th highest rated drama of all time. It is considered the breakout role of lead actor Yoon Shi-yoon, catapulting him to immense popularity as well as receiving much praise for his sincere acting.

Synopsis 
Kim Tak-gu (Yoon Shi-yoon) is the eldest son of Gu Il-jong, the chairman of Geosung Foods Enterprise, and Kim Mi-sun, his mistress. The chairman's wife, In-sook, is furious with her husband and shuns Tak-gu. When his mother is kidnapped, Tak-gu runs away from home and spends the next 12 years looking for her.

In his journey, he enters a baking school owned by Pal-bong who is a legend in the baking industry. Coincidentally, he was also Tak-gu's father's teacher.
In said school, Tak-gu also finds Jo Jin-goo, the man who kidnapped his mother. Jo Jin-goo tells Tak-gu that his mother accidentally fell off a cliff.
Tak-gu decides to stay at the bakery and learn the art of making bread, like his father did before him. Gu Ma-jun (Joo Won), Tak-gu's half-brother, is also at the school, hoping to learn baking to win his father's approval and take over the family business. He lives under an assumed name and never reveals his true identity. Ma-jun still nurses a hatred for Tak-gu from their childhood.

It is later revealed that Tak-gu's mom is not dead and that she is looking for him. The chairman, who also spent the past 14 years looking for Tak-gu, eventually finds out that he is at the bakery and is furious at Ma-jun for not telling him. The chairman wants Tak-gu, his eldest son, to take over the family business instead of Ma-jun. Rejected, Ma-jun plots to steal Tak-gu's childhood friend, Shin Yoo-kyung (Eugene), and embarrass his family in the process. Tak-gu eventually finds his mother, but In-sook and her lover, Han (the chairman's assistant), plot to rob Tak-gu of his inheritance to let Ma-jun take the chairman's position. When the chairman finds out, Han attempts to murder Tak-gu, but Tak-gu is saved by Jo Jin-goo. Meanwhile, Ma-jun's plan to embarrass his family works, but it doesn't give him the satisfaction he expects. He reaches a truce with Tak-gu and the two agree to let their older sister, Gu Ja-kyung, run the company. The show ends with Tak-gu continuing to work at the bakery with his girlfriend, Yang Mi-sun (Lee Young-ah), while Ma-jun decides to travel around the world with his new bride, Shin Yoo-kyung. Manager Han is imprisoned and the chairman is happy that at last, his loved ones found happiness.

Cast

Main 
 Yoon Shi-yoon as Kim Tak-gu
 Oh Jae-moo as young Kim Tak-gu
 Eugene as Shin Yoo-kyung
 Jo Jung-eun as young Shin Yoo-kyung
 Joo Won as Gu Ma-jun / Seo Tae-jo
Shin Dong-woo as young Gu Ma-jun
 Lee Young-ah as Yang Mi-sun

Supporting

Gu family
 Jun Kwang-ryul as Gu Il-jong
 Jeon In-hwa as Seo In-sook
 Choi Ja-hye as Gu Ja-kyung
 Ha Seung-ri as teenage Gu Ja-kyung
 Kang Ye-seo as young Gu Ja-Kyung
 Choi Yoon-young as Gu Ja-rim
 Kim So-hyun as young Gu Ja-rim

Yang family
 Jang Hang-sun as Pal-bong (Yang Mi-sun's grandfather)
 Park Sang-myun as Yang In-mok (Yang Mi-sun's father)
 Hwang Mi-sun  as Oh Young-ja (Yang Mi-sun's mother)

Others
 Jung Sung-mo as Han Seung-jae
 Park Sung-woong as Jo Jin-goo
 Lee Han-wi as Heo Gab-soo
 Jeon Mi-seon as Kim Mi-sun
 Jung Hye-sun as Madam Hong (Grandmother)
 Kwon Yong-woon as Shin Bae (Yoo-kyung's father)
 Park Yong-jin as Go Jae-bok

Soundtrack 
 At The End of The Day (하루의 끝에) – V.O.S
 Love You to Death (죽도록 사랑해) – KCM feat. Soul Drive
 That Person (그 사람) – Lee Seung-chul
 Only One (단 한사람) – Bada
 Hope is a Dream That Doesn't Sleep (희망은 잠들지 않는 꿈) – Kyuhyun (Super Junior)
 For Me (나를 위해) – Michelle Yoo-jin
 Only You (너 하나만) – Yoon Shi-yoon
 It Was Love (사랑이야) – Lee Young-ah
 My Love (내사랑) – Joo Won
 Now Go and See (지금 만나러 간다) – Code V

Awards 
2010 3rd Korea Drama Awards
 Best New Actor (Yoon Shi-yoon)
 Best Director in a Serial Drama (Lee Jung-sub)
 Best Writer in a Serial Drama (Kang Eun-kyung)

2010 18th Korean Culture and Entertainment Awards
 Popularity Award, Actor (Yoon Shi-yoon)

2010 KBS Drama Awards
 Top Excellence Award, Actress (Jeon In-hwa)
 Excellence Award, Actor in a Special Production Drama (Yoon Shi-yoon)
 Excellence Award, Actress in a Special Production Drama (Eugene)
 Best Writer (Kang Eun-kyung)
 Best Young Actor (Oh Jae-moo)
 Best Couple Award (Yoon Shi-yoon and Lee Young-ah)

2011 47th Baeksang Arts Awards
 Best TV Director (Lee Jung-sub)

Reception 

The show was well received in South Korea, receiving a record viewer rating of 50.8%. Audiences were attached to the show because of its underdog vs. society theme. Naver listed it as the most searched for item in South Korea of 2010.

On December 20, 2010, the series received presidential honors in a ceremony that thanked cultural content producers for their achievements.

Ratings

It aired on GMA Network from January 3 to April 29, 2011, on weeknights at 10:00 PM PST. It was moved to the 9:15 PM timeslot due to its high ratings but later moved back to its original slot to give way to the local shows. Each episode runs 45 minutes including commercial breaks. The entire series was dubbed in Filipino.

References

External links 
  
 
 
 

Korean Broadcasting System television dramas
2010 South Korean television series debuts
2010 South Korean television series endings
Korean-language television shows
Fictional bakers
Television shows written by Kang Eun-kyung
South Korean comedy-drama television series
South Korean cooking television series
Television series by Samhwa Networks